Muthupettai Somu Bhaskar (born 13 September 1957) is an Indian actor who appears in Tamil films. Before entering the film industry, he was a theatre artist, he made his film debut in 1987 in a small role in the film  Thirumathi Oru Vegumathi. This was followed by several films in the 1990s, in which he appeared in very minor or small roles. After he got film breakthrough in Engal Anna (2004),  then he became a regular cast and widely recognized supporting and comedy actor in Tamil cinema. 

In addition to acting, Bhaskar is a dubbing artist and occasional playback singer as well. He is best known for his performances in the series Chinna Papa Periya Papa (2000), Selvi (2005) and Arasi (2007). 

He won the Best Character Artiste in Mozhi (2007) and the Best Actor in a supporting Role for his performance in 8 Thottakkal (2017).

Career

Bhaskar, who hails from Muthupettai, near Pattukkottai was born and brought up in Nagapattinam, he was a part of a Tamil drama troupe 'Society for New Drama' which performed modern theatrical plays in Tamil Nadu. To supplement his income, Bhaskar also worked as an LIC agent for a brief period. Bhaskar acted in a number of other troupes including Nungambakkam Boys Kondatum and also worked in All India Radio and Doordarshan. Before acting, he worked in a toothpaste company.

During this period, Bhaskar began as a dubbing artist especially for dubbing Telugu films into Tamil where he spoke the comedian's lines. He also dubs English language films into Tamil for Sun TV. 

When the dramatic society ended in 1992, Bhaskar began working in tele-serials on DD1 and DD2 including Nam Kudumbam and Vizhudugal, before he played roles in Ganga Yamuna Saraswati and in 1999 teleserial Mayavi Marichan which also starred Thadi Balaji in the lead role. He then landed a role in the comedy series Chinna Papa Periya Papa, in which he played the role of a and brother-in-law and in Senior Junior, Selvi and Arasi.

Bhaskar made his film début in 1987, enacting a small role in the film Thirumathi Oru Vegumathi. This was followed by several films in the 1990s, in which he appeared in very minor or small roles. He then appeared in supporting roles for the films Engal Anna (2004), Thirupaachi (2005), Sivakasi (2005), Mozhi (2007), Sivaji: The Boss (2007), Sadhu Miranda (2008), Santosh Subramaniam (2008), Dasavathaaram (2008) and 8 Thottakkal (2017). For his role in director Radha Mohan’s Mozhi, which won him his Tamil Nadu State Film Award for Best Character Artiste (Male). In Malaysia to Amnesia (2021), Bhaskar is collaborating with Radha Mohan for the seventh time. MS Bhaskar, whose outing here proves yet again that he is a multi-purpose actor with an ability to pull off comedy easily.

Personal life
His elder sister Hemamalini is also a dubbing artist. 
His daughter Ishwarya is a dubbing artist in the Tamil film industry for leading actresses. His son Aadithya Bhaskar made his acting debut portraying younger version of Vijay Sethupathi's character in 96 (2018).

Partial filmography

Actor
Films  

Television
 1991 Nam Kudumbam
 1991 Vizhudugal
 1992 Mayavi Marichan
 1996 Kaiyalavu Manasu
 1997 Premi
 1990s Senior Junior
 2000-2001 Anandha Bhavan as Narasimhan
 2001-2002 Vazhndu Kattukiren as Lalaji Seth
 2000 Ganga Yamuna Saraswati
 2000-2006 Chinna Papa Periya Papa as Pattabi
 2000-2001 Vaazhkai as Zinda
 2001-2003 Alaigal as Mouli
 2005-2006 Selvi as Aandavar Lingam
 2007 Arasi as Aandavar Lingam

 Web series
 2018 America Mappillai (cameo)

Dubbing artist
Partial Filmography

Serials

As narrator
Ambuttu Imbuttu Embuttu (2005)

References

External links 

 

Indian male film actors
Tamil male actors
Indian male television actors
Living people
Tamil comedians
Male actors in Tamil cinema
Place of birth missing (living people)
1952 births
People from Tiruvarur district
Tamil Nadu State Film Awards winners
Indian male voice actors